Epigastric vessels refer to the epigastric arteries and veins. There are three epigastric arteries the superficial, superior and inferior. The veins are named in the same way with a superficial, superior and inferior epigastric vein.

Cardiovascular system
Arteries of the abdomen